Bullanaikanahulikatti is a village in Dharwad district of Karnataka, India.

Demographics 
As of the 2011 Census of India there were 141 households in Bullanaikanahulikatti and a total population of 749 consisting of 410 males and 339 females. There were 103 children ages 0-6.

References

Villages in Dharwad district